"Turn It Up" is a song performed by Dutch DJ and record producer Armin van Buuren. It was released on 15 March 2019 by the label Armind on Armada Music, as the ninth single from the album Balance. The song sounds similar with the 2018 Armin van Buuren's previous song "Blah Blah Blah".

Background 
Armin van Buuren declared about the song: "I'm always excited for the festival season because of the crowd's response to tracks like these. Nothing beats the feeling you get when fans go absolutely nuts to something you play, and 'Turn It Up' was made for that exact purpose. I'm really looking forward to playing this one all throughout the summer."

Track listings
Digital download
"Turn It Up" – 2:52

Digital download – extended
"Turn It Up" (extended mix) – 6:45
"Turn It Up" (a cappella) – 1:32
 
Digital download – remixes
"Turn It Up" (Dropgun extended remix) – 3:43
"Turn It Up" (Sound Rush extended remix) – 4:25
"Turn It Up" (Clément Leroux extended remix) – 6:19
"Turn It Up" (Gian Verala extended remix) – 3:42

Charts

Weekly charts

Year-end charts

References

 

2019 singles
2019 songs
Songs written by Ki Fitzgerald
Songs written by Armin van Buuren
Armin van Buuren songs
Armada Music singles